An original design manufacturer is a company that designs and manufactures a product that is eventually rebranded by another firm for sale. Such companies allow the firm that owns or licenses the brand to produce products while having to engage in neither the detailed engineering work required to specify a product for manufacturing nor the organization and running of a factory. (The ODM products may be the brand owner's primary business or may be a supplement to another line of business, such as general retailing.) This is in contrast to using a contract manufacturer, where the contracting company would design the product and supply those specifications to the manufacturer.

Original design manufacturers have grown in size in recent years and, many have the scale to handle production in-house for the products that are branded by the buying firm. 

This model is especially used in international trade, where a local original design manufacturer is used to produce goods for a foreign company that sees some advantage in the transaction, such as low labor-inputs, transport links or proximity to markets. Innovative and/or patented technologies developed/owned by the original design manufacturer are another cause for this product distribution model. original design manufacturer models are also used where local ownership-laws possibly prohibit direct ownership of assets by foreigners, allowing a local firm to produce for a brand company - either for the domestic market or for export.

This type of business is part of "outsourcing". For example: Compal Electronics makes notebook computers and monitors, and operates as a mass producer for numerous brand companies, assisted by low labor-costs, low-cost transport, and the near-commodity nature of the physical inputs (in Compal's case, computer components). , Taiwanese original design manufacturers made ninety-four percent of all notebook computers. Some companies such as Flex and Wistron are both original design manufacturers and providers of Electronics manufacturing services.

Post-2016 Nokia phones (HMD) is an example of a firm which relies on original design manufacturers. In late 2019, it switched from relying on only one original design manufacturer to multiple original design manufacturers.

Intellectual property
Original design manufacturers create their own intellectual property and are very proactive in patenting it.  Most of their patents are filed in the US, China, and Taiwan.

See also 
 White label product
 Product rebranding
 Electronics manufacturing services
 Original equipment manufacturer
 Contract manufacturer

References

Brands
Design companies